The ENV (Emission Neutral Vehicle) is an electric motorcycle prototype powered by a hydrogen fuel cell. It was developed by Intelligent Energy, a British company.

Specifications

The vehicle and the fuel cell centre respectively weigh approximately 80 and 20 kilograms. It uses a proton-exchange membrane fuel cell to generate about 8 hp or 6 kilowatts. The Discovery Channel has indicated it can reach approximately 80 km/h and, on a full tank may ride continuously for about 4 hours and travel a distance of 160 kilometres. The motorcycle is a preproduction prototype, which was targeted to sell for approximately $6000.

See also
 Hydrogen vehicle

References

External links
Intelligent Energy
Business Week article
 Fuel cell motorcycle, The Discovery Channel, reproduced at youtube.com, Oct 11, 2006

Hydrogen motorcycles